Below is a list of chairpersons of the National Council of Namibia.

References

Chairpersons
Namibia
Namibia